The Dragon Boat Festival is a traditional Chinese holiday which occurs on the fifth day of the fifth month of the Chinese calendar, which corresponds to late May or June in the Gregorian calendar.

A commemoration of the ancient poet Qu Yuan, the holiday is celebrated by holding dragon boat races and eating sticky rice dumplings called zongzi.

Names
The English language name for the holiday is Dragon Boat Festival, used as the official English translation of the holiday by the People's Republic of China. It is also referred to in some English sources as Double Fifth Festival which alludes to the date as in the original Chinese name.

Chinese names by region 
Duanwu, as the festival is called in Mandarin Chinese, literally means "starting/opening horse", i.e., the first "horse day" (according to the Chinese zodiac/Chinese calendar system) to occur on the month; however, despite the literal meaning being wǔ, "the [day of the] horse in the animal cycle", this character has also been interchangeably construed as wǔ meaning "five". Hence Duanwu, the "festival on the fifth day of the fifth month".

The Mandarin Chinese name of the festival is "" in Mainland China and Taiwan, and "Tuen Ng Festival" for Hong Kong, Macao, Malaysia and Singapore.

It is pronounced variously in different Chinese dialects. In Cantonese, it is romanized as Tuen1 Ng5 Jit3 in Hong Kong and Tung1 Ng5 Jit3 in Macau. Hence the "Tuen Ng Festival" in Hong Kong Tun Ng (Festividade do Barco-Dragão in Portuguese) in Macao.

History

Origin
The fifth lunar month is considered an unlucky and poisonous month, and the fifth day of the fifth month especially so. To get rid of the misfortune, people would put calamus, Artemisia, and garlic above the doors on the fifth day of the fifth month. These were believed to help ward off evil by their strong smell and their shape (for instance, calamus leaves are shaped like swords).

The fifth month of the lunar calendar was regarded as a bad month and the fifth day of the month a bad day. Venomous animals were said to appear starting from the fifth day of the fifth month, such as snakes, centipedes, and scorpions; people also supposedly get sick easily after this day. Therefore, during the Dragon Boat Festival, people try to avoid this bad luck. For example, people may put pictures of the five poisonous creatures (snake, centipede, scorpion, lizard, toad, and sometimes spider) on the wall and stick needles in them. People may also make paper cutouts of the five creatures and wrap them around the wrists of their children. Big ceremonies and performances developed from these practices in many areas, making the Dragon Boat Festival a day for getting rid of disease and bad luck.

Qu Yuan

The story best known in modern China holds that the festival commemorates the death of the poet and minister Qu Yuan (–278 BC) of the ancient state of Chu during the Warring States period of the Zhou dynasty. A cadet member of the Chu royal house, Qu served in high offices. However, when the king decided to ally with the increasingly powerful state of Qin, Qu was banished for opposing the alliance and even accused of treason. During his exile, Qu Yuan wrote a great deal of poetry. Eventually, Qin captured Ying, the Chu capital. In despair, Qu Yuan committed suicide by drowning himself in the Miluo River.

It is said that the local people, who admired him, raced out in their boats to save him, or at least retrieve his body. This is said to have been the origin of dragon boat races. When his body could not be found, they dropped balls of sticky rice into the river so that the fish would eat them instead of Qu Yuan's body. This is said to be the origin of zongzi.

During the twentieth century, Qu Yuan became considered a patriotic poet and a symbol of the people. He was promoted as a folk hero and a symbol of Chinese nationalism in the People's Republic of China after the 1949 Communist victory in the Chinese Civil War. The historian and writer Guo Moruo was influential in shaping this view of Qu.

Wu Zixu

Another origin story says that the festival commemorates Wu Zixu (died 484 BC), a statesman of the Kingdom of Wu. Xi Shi, a beautiful woman sent by King Goujian of the state of Yue, was much loved by King Fuchai of Wu. Wu Zixu, seeing the dangerous plot of Goujian, warned Fuchai, who became angry at this remark. Wu Zixu was forced to commit suicide by Fuchai, with his body thrown into the river on the fifth day of the fifth month. After his death, in places such as Suzhou, Wu Zixu is remembered during the Dragon Boat Festival.

Cao E

Although Wu Zixu is commemorated in southeast Jiangsu and Qu Yuan elsewhere in China, much of Northeastern Zhejiang including the cities of Shaoxing, Ningbo and Zhoushan celebrates the memory of the young girl Cao E (AD 130–144) instead. Cao E's father Cao Xu was a shaman who presided over local ceremonies at Shangyu. In 143, while presiding over a ceremony commemorating Wu Zixu during the Dragon Boat Festival, Cao Xu accidentally fell into the Shun River. Cao E, in an act of filial piety, decided to find her father in the river, searching for 3 days trying to find him. After five days, she and her father were both found dead in the river from drowning. Eight years later, in 151, a temple was built in Shangyu dedicated to the memory of Cao E and her sacrifice for filial piety. The Shun River was renamed Cao'e River in her honor. Cao E is depicted in the Wu Shuang Pu (Table of Peerless Heroes) by Jin Guliang.

Pre-existing holiday
Some modern research suggests that the stories of Qu Yuan or Wu Zixu were superimposed onto a pre-existing holiday tradition. The promotion of these stories might be encouraged by Confucian scholars, seeking to legitimize and strengthen their influence in China. The relationship between zongzi, Qu Yuan and the festival, first appeared during the early Han dynasty.

The stories of both Qu Yuan and Wu Zixu were recorded in Sima Qian's Shiji, completed 187 and 393 years after the events, respectively, because historians wanted to praise both characters.

According to historians, the holiday originated as a celebration of agriculture, fertility, and rice growing in southern China. As recently as 1952 the American sociologist Wolfram Eberhard wrote that it was more widely celebrated in southern China than in the north.

Another theory is that the Dragon Boat Festival originated from dragon worship. This theory was advanced by Wen Yiduo. Support is drawn from two key traditions of the festival: the tradition of dragon boat racing and zongzi. The food may have originally represented an offering to the dragon king, while dragon boat racing naturally reflects a reverence for the dragon and the active yang energy associated with it. This was merged with the tradition of visiting friends and family on boats.

Another suggestion is that the festival celebrates a widespread feature of east Asian agrarian societies: the harvest of winter wheat. Offerings were regularly made to deities and spirits at such times: in the ancient Yue, dragon kings; in the ancient Chu, Qu Yuan; in the ancient Wu, Wu Zixu (as a river god); in ancient Korea, mountain gods (see Dano). As interactions between different regions increased, these similar festivals eventually merged into one holiday.

Early 20th century
In the early 20th Century the Dragon Boat Festival was observed from the first to the fifth days of the fifth month, and also known as the
Festival of Five Poisonous Insects.
Yu Der Ling writes in chapter 11 of her 1911 memoir Two Years in the Forbidden City:
The first day of the fifth moon was a busy day for us all, as from the first to the fifth of the fifth moon was the festival of five poisonous insects, which I will explain later—also called the Dragon Boat Festival.... Now about this Feast. It is also called the Dragon Boat Feast. The fifth of the fifth moon at noon was the most poisonous hour for the poisonous insects, and reptiles such as frogs, lizards, snakes, hide in the mud, for that hour they are paralyzed. Some medical men search for them at that hour and place them in jars, and when they are dried, sometimes use them as medicine. Her Majesty told me this, so that day I went all over everywhere and dug into the ground, but found nothing.

21st century
In 2008 the Dragon Boat Festival was made a national public holiday in China.

Public holiday

The festival was long marked as a cultural festival in China and is a public holiday in China, Hong Kong SAR, Macau SAR, and Taiwan (ROC). The People's Republic of China government established in 1949 did not initially recognize the Dragon Boat Festival as a public holiday but reintroduced it in 2008 alongside two other festivals in a bid to boost traditional culture.

Dragon Boat Festival is unofficially observed by the Chinese communities of Southeast Asia, including Singapore and Malaysia. Equivalent and related official festivals include the Korean Dano, Japanese Tango no sekku, and Vietnamese Tết Đoan Ngọ.

Practices and activities

Three of the most widespread activities conducted during the Dragon Boat Festival are eating (and preparing) zongzi, drinking realgar wine, and racing dragon boats.

Dragon boat racing

Dragon boat racing has a rich history of ancient ceremonial and ritualistic traditions, which originated in southern central China more than 2500 years ago. The legend starts with the story of Qu Yuan, who was a minister in one of the Warring State governments, Chu. He was slandered by jealous government officials and banished by the king. Out of disappointment in the Chu monarch, he drowned himself in the Miluo River. The common people rushed to the water and tried to recover his body, but they failed. In commemoration of Qu Yuan, people hold dragon boat races yearly on the day of his death according to the legend. They also scattered rice into the water to feed the fish, to prevent them from eating Qu Yuan's body, which is one of the origins of zongzi.

Zongzi (traditional Chinese rice dumpling)

A notable part of celebrating Dragon Boat Festival is making and eating zongzi with family members and friends. People traditionally make zongzi by wrapping glutinous rice and fillings in leaves of reed or bamboo, forming a pyramid shape. The leaves also give a special aroma and flavor to the sticky rice and fillings. Choices of fillings vary depending on regions. Northern regions in China prefer sweet or dessert-styled zongzi, with bean paste, jujube, and nuts as fillings. Southern regions in China prefer savory zongzi, with a variety of fillings including eggs and meat.

Zongzi appeared before the Spring and Autumn Period and was originally used to worship ancestors and gods; in the Jin Dynasty, Zongzi became a festive food for the Dragon Boat Festival. Jin Dynasty, dumplings were officially designated as the Dragon Boat Festival food. At this time, in addition to glutinous rice, the raw materials for making zongzi are also added with Chinese medicine Yizhiren. The cooked zongzi is called "yizhi zong".

Food related to 5
'Wu' (午) in the name 'Duanwu' in Chinese has a similar pronunciation as the number 5 in multiple dialects, and thus many regions have traditions of eating food that is related to the number 5. For example, the Guangdong and Hong Kong regions have the tradition of having congee made from 5 different beans.

Realgar wine
Realgar wine or Xionghuang wine is a Chinese alcoholic drink that is made from Chinese liquor dosed with powdered realgar, a yellow-orange arsenic sulfide mineral. It was traditionally used as a pesticide, and as a common antidote against disease and venom.

5-colored silk-threaded braid
In some regions of China, people, especially children, wear silk ribbons or threads of 5 colors (blue, red, yellow, white, and black, representing the five elements) on the day of the Dragon Boat Festival. People believe that this will help keep evil away.

Other common activities include hanging up icons of Zhong Kui (a mythic guardian figure), hanging mugwort and calamus, taking long walks, and wearing perfumed medicine bags. Other traditional activities include a game of making an egg stand at noon (this "game" implies that if someone succeeds in making the egg stand at exactly 12:00 noon, that person will receive luck for the next year), and writing spells. All of these activities, together with the drinking of realgar wine or water, were regarded by the ancients and some today as effective in preventing disease or evil while promoting health and well-being.

In the early years of the Republic of China, Duanwu was celebrated as the "Poets' Day" due to Qu Yuan's status as China's first known poet. The Taiwanese also sometimes conflate the spring practice of egg-balancing with Duanwu.

The sun is considered to be at its strongest around the time of summer solstice, as the daylight in the northern hemisphere is the longest. The sun, like the Chinese dragon, traditionally represents masculine energy, whereas the moon, like the phoenix, traditionally represents feminine energy. The summer solstice is considered the annual peak of male energy while the winter solstice, the longest night of the year, represents the annual peak of feminine energy. The masculine image of the dragon has thus associated with the Dragon Boat Festival.

Gallery

See also
 Bon Om Touk
 Dano (Korean festival)
 Traditional Chinese holidays

Explanatory notes

References

Citations

Bibliography

External links
 

Boat festivals
Dragon boat racing
Festivals in China
Intangible Cultural Heritage of Humanity
May observances
June observances
Observances set by the Chinese calendar
Public holidays in China
Summer events in China